IEEE Transactions on Advanced Packaging was a quarterly peer-reviewed scientific journal published by the IEEE Components, Packaging & Manufacturing Technology Society and the IEEE Photonics Society. It covered research on the design, modeling, and applications of  multi-chip modules and wafer-scale integration. It was established in 1999 and ceased publication in 2010. The last editor-in-chief was Ganesh Subbarayan (Purdue University). According to the Journal Citation Reports, the journal had a 2010 impact factor of 1.276.

References

External links
 

Physics journals
Quarterly journals
Packaging (microfabrication)
Transactions on Advanced Packaging
Publications established in 1999
English-language journals
Engineering journals
Publications disestablished in 2010